Vosper Thornycroft may refer to:

John I. Thornycroft & Company, a British shipbuilding firm based in Woolston, Southampton from 1904 to 2003 which merged with Vosper & Company in 1966 to form Vosper Thornycroft which later became VT Group
Vosper & Company, a British shipbuilding company based in Portsmouth which merged with John I. Thornycroft & Company in 1966 to form Vosper Thornycroft which later became VT Group
Babcock International, a multinational corporation headquartered in the United Kingdom which took over Vosper Thornycroft/VT Group in 2010, and continues its UK and international operations
VT Group, the name of Vosper Thornycroft from 2002 to 2012 during which period it absorbed international and US based defence and services companies; and from 2012 the name of a United States defence and services company which bought the US based operations of the former Vosper Thornycroft company from Babcock International